Just Visiting is the self-titled independently released album by Christian pop/rock band Just Visiting, later known as the Elms.

Track listing 
All tracks written by Owen Thomas
"Hi Fi (They Don't Compare)" – 2:57
"Jug of Pennies" – 3:45
"Cast a Stone" – 4:22
"Whadda 'Ya Say?" – 3:04
"When I Fall Away" – 3:33
"Incense & Tie Dye" – 4:29
"The Choice You Wouldn't Make" – 6:01
"Star Is Fading" – 4:41
"Supernothing" – 4:40
"About Worth" – 6:54

Personnel
Owen Thomas – Vocals, guitar, piano
Christopher D. Thomas – Drums, vocals

1998 albums
The Elms (band) albums